Erol Büyükburç (8 August 1936 – 12 March 2015) was a Turkish singer-songwriter, pop music composer, and actor.

Early years and family life
Büyükburç was born on 8 August 1936 in Adana. After primary school in his hometown and commerce-high school in Istanbul, he briefly studied economy the Istanbul University. However, he abandoned the higher education after choosing a music career.

From his relationship with Türkan Türker, he had two daughters; Ajlan (born in 1970) and Jeyan (born in 1977). Ajlan, a talented singer, died at age 28 in a car accident on 22 July 1999. Büyükburç was hospitalized into the intensive care unit with heart problems after learning about the death of his daughter, whom he loved very much. He had adopted Ajlan in her later years while he did not recognize his other child Esra Elik, a daughter from his relationship with Seher Elik.

He had first married 24-year-old Emel in 1976. From this marriage, he became the father of daughter Evren in 1978. His wife Emel died from cancer on 22 September 2001. After Emel's death, he married Gönül Demirkol and had a daughter, Özlem. Erol and Gönül divorced after one and a half years. Later, he married a German citizen Ute User in 2004.

Career

Music
While studying in university, he entered Istanbul Municipal Conservatory. Later, he began singing in various jazz bands. During his compulsory military service in Urfa he served in the officers' clup as a singer. Upon returning to Istanbul, he was introduced to music producers by Leyla Sayar a well known actress whom he met in Urfa. In 1961, he composed his best known hit Little Lucy. He also wrote the lyrics of this melody. Before the 1960s, Turkish pop music was mostly covers of West European melodies. There were a few compositions in Turkish also. Little Lucy is considered as one of the milestones in Turkish popular music. Not only because it was one of the earliest popular music compositions, which the music enthusiasts warmly greeted, but also it was sung in English, quite unlike the earlier examples. Kiss me, Lovers Wish and Memories were also his English-lyrics compositions.

In the Balkan Music Festival held on 2 September 1964, he won the Best Singer title. The next year, he won the Bosphorus Music Festival Award. After the 1980s, he began singing in various genres including children's songs and football teams' songs.

Film
Beginning by 1964, Erol Büyükburç played in musical films. He also appeared as juror in the Show TV singing contest titled Şarkı Söylemek Lazım (literally "You have to sing") in 2007. A sudden quarrel with the program presenter he picked during the live show of that singing contest caused quite a sensation.

Death
He was found dead by his manager Osman Nuri Yazıcı at his home on 12 March 2015, 10 days before his 79th birthday. He had been treated with implanted coronary stents three times, and suffered from diabetes and hypertension. It was reported that he had died after suffering a heart attack while resting in his apartment in Etiler, Istanbul. He had a stage concert scheduled in Bursa the evening of the day he died.

Following a memorial ceremony in Cemal Reşit Rey Concert Hall, and the religious funeral service at Levent Mosque, he was laid to rest in Zincirlikuyu Cemetery. He was survived by his former wife Ute User, children Jeyan Büyükburç, Evren Büyükburç Erol,  musician Özlem Büyükburç Kaya, his grandchildren Armağan and Lalehan Kaya.

Discography

Filmography

References

External links

1936 births
2015 deaths
People from Adana
People with diabetes
Burials at Zincirlikuyu Cemetery
Turkish pop singers
Turkish singer-songwriters